Christine Reta Arkinstall (born 1954) is a New Zealand academic. She is currently professor of European languages and literature at the University of Auckland.

Career
After a BA from University of Auckland, Arkinstall obtained a Masters from University of Oviedo in Spain, before returning to Auckland for a PhD entitled  'El sujeto en el exilio: un estudio de la obra poética de Francisco Brines, José Angel Valente y José Manuel Caballero Bonald.'  She joined the staff, researching nationhood and gender ideas in Spanish-speaking literatures. Rising to full professor in 2010.

References

External links
 Researchgate
 institutional homepage

Living people
New Zealand women academics
University of Oviedo alumni
University of Auckland alumni
Academic staff of the University of Auckland
1954 births
New Zealand expatriates in Spain
New Zealand women writers